The Nysted Wind Farm (also known as Rødsand) is a Danish offshore wind farm close to the Rødsand sand bank near Lolland. Gravity base foundations are used rather than piles due to ice conditions.

Rødsand I

Rødsand I was built in 2003, with 72 turbines and a total capacity of 166 MW, and was the largest in the world until 2007. Annual production is some 570 GW·h, the equivalent to the electricity consumption of 140,000 Danish homes, which could save 500,000 tonnes of  emissions.  Turbines were installed by A2SEA. It receives 45 øre per kW·h for the first 42,000 full-load hours, which is about 11 years.

Rødsand I was out for 4 months in 2007 when the main transformer suffered a malfunction, causing a production loss of 23 million DKK per month.

In September 2010, DONG bought E.ON's 20% share and sold half of the entire project to pension fund PensionDanmark for 700 million kroner (€94 million / US$120 million) — almost half the DKK1,600 million cost. Stadtwerke Lübeck also owns a share.

 it has an availability of 97 percent.

Rødsand II
In 2010, a 207 MW extension of the existing wind farm was installed by E.ON at a stated cost of EUR450m and a power purchase agreement at DKK 0.629 per kW·h (US$0.12/kW·h). It was originally scheduled to be completed in 2011, but installation happened faster than projected, and on 15 July 2010, E.ON reported that all turbines had been installed and the majority were supplying power to the Danish grid. On 3 August, E.ON reported that the wind farm was ready and went into operation, three months ahead of schedule.
Rødsand 2 was inaugurated on 12 October.

In November 2013, local power company SEAS-NVE bought 80% of Rødsand 2 for a price of DKK 2.8 billion and thus valuating the wind farm at DKK 3.5 billion.

See also

Wind power in Denmark
List of offshore wind farms in Denmark
List of wind farms
List of offshore wind farms
List of offshore wind farms in the Baltic Sea

References

External links
 Official website for Rødsand 1 
 Official website for Rødsand 2 
 Drawings of Rødsand 2 construction
 LORC Knowledge - Datasheet for Nysted 1 Offshore Wind Farm 
 LORC Knowledge - Datasheet for Rødsand 2

Wind farms in Denmark
Offshore wind farms in the Baltic Sea
Ørsted (company) wind farms
Energy infrastructure completed in 2003
2003 establishments in Denmark